Whispers in the Wind – Acoustic Improvisations was recorded in December 2005 for Neal Morse's Inner Circle fan club and is made up of guitar and piano improvisations.  Some of the ideas on it will be developed further and will appear on official releases in the future. There are a few solos overdubbing the improvisations, but otherwise the material was not edited for mistakes or content.


Personnel

Band
 Neal Morse - guitar and piano

Track listing
 Disk - Total Time 73:59
"Acst Guitar Improv 1"  – 13:44
"Piano Improv 1"  – 18:38
"Acst Guitar Improv 2"  – 11:14
"Piano Improv 2"  – 9:48
"Acst Guitar Improv 3"  – 20:35

Release details
2006, USA, Radiant Records, release date 19 January 2006, CD

Neal Morse albums
Self-released albums
2006 live albums